Sokolsky (masculine), Sokolskaya (feminine), or Sokolskoye (neuter) is the name of several inhabited localities in Russia.

Urban localities
Sokolskoye, Nizhny Novgorod Oblast, a work settlement in Sokolsky District of Nizhny Novgorod Oblast

Rural localities
Sokolsky (rural locality), a settlement in Bugulminsky District of the Republic of Tatarstan
Sokolskoye, Ivanovo Oblast, a selo in Lukhsky District of Ivanovo Oblast
Sokolskoye, Kostroma Oblast, a village in Nikolo-Makarovskoye Settlement of Makaryevsky District of Kostroma Oblast